Engage With Grace is a non-profit, viral movement designed to help get the conversation about the end-of-life experience started. The movement is built around The One Slide, which has  five questions on it and can be used as a tool to help people better understand and communicate their preferences with their loved ones. Engage With Grace  also promotes the importance of supporting each other’s preferences and ensuring that these wishes are honored.

History
The concept for Engage With Grace was developed by Alexandra Drane (Co-Founder and Chairman of the Board of Eliza Corporation) and Matthew Holt (Founder of Health2.0 and The Health Care Blog) in the summer of 2008, following a discussion around the fact that so few people discuss their end-of-life preferences. Both Holt and Drane had personally experienced the consequences of not being sure of their loved ones’ preferences. In addition, they wanted to address statistics like the one suggesting that 73% of Americans would prefer to die at home, but only about 25% do.

Engage With Grace was launched in October 2008 at the Health 2.0 conference in San Francisco.

Viral campaign
Around Thanksgiving 2008, Engage With Grace supporters launched the first-ever documented Blog rally — organized to encourage families to discuss end-of-life care issues while gathered together for the Thanksgiving holiday weekend. More than 100 blogs participated. The Engage With Grace team launched a second blog rally around Thanksgiving of 2009, again with more than 100 participants and countless Tweets and Facebook posts.

Accolades and recognition
Engage With Grace ranks as one of the 10 phrases that became part of the healthcare lexicon in 2009. In addition, Engage With Grace co-founder Alexandra Drane received the Boston Business Journal’s “Champions of Healthcare: Community Outreach” award for her work on Engage With Grace.

References

External links
 
 
 
 

American social networking websites
American medical websites